Ray Stephens may refer to:
 Ray Stephens (baseball)
 Ray Stephens (singer) (1954–1990), American singer and actor

See also
 Ray Stevens (born 1939), American country and pop singer-songwriter and comedian